Chandigarh Comets (CCO) is hockey team based in Chandigarh, which is one of the eight teams that plays in World Series Hockey. Pakistani striker Rehan Butt is the captain of the team and Harendra Singh is the coach. Sector 42 Stadium is the home ground of Chandigarh Comets.

Chandigarh Comets were at the top of the table in the league phase but ended up as the semi-finalists of the inaugural edition of WSH. They lost to Pune Strykers in the semi-final 3–4 in the penalty shoot-outs. Gurjinder Singh was leading goal scorer for the team who also top-scored in the tournament along with Syed Imran Warsi with 19 goals apiece.

History

2012 season

Comets played the inaugural match of the season against Bhopal Badshahs at their home ground where they faced a 4–3 defeat. They continued with a 3–5 loss from Chennai Cheetahs. A 5–2 win over Mumbai Marines fetched them their first victory and first points on the table for the season. With an average start to the season they made a remarkable performance in the later stage. Chandigarh won almost all of their next 10 league matches though they were held by Bhopal Badshahs 4–4 despite of leading by 4 goals to none at one stage. Their only defeat came against Sher-e-Punjab where they lost 5–2. A 4–3 win against Mumbai Marines in their penultimate league stage match got them through to the semi-finals. They ended up as the table toppers after a 6–1 win over Karnataka Lions in their final match.

The faced Pune Strykers in the semi-final at Mahindra Hockey Stadium in Mumbai. Leading the match 4–1 at one stage, they seemed through to the finals before Strykers fought back. A last minute goal by Pune leveled the score 4–4. Misses by the skipper Rehan Butt and Canadian Sukhwinder Singh ended the penalty shoot-outs with 3–2 one the board in the favor of Pune and as a result, Chandigarh Comets were knocked out from the tournament.

Team Composition
The team is led by Rehan Butt and coached by Harendra Singh.

Fixtures and Results

2012

Statistics

Hat-tricks

4 Player scored 4 goals

References

See also
World Series Hockey

World Series Hockey teams
Sport in Chandigarh
2012 establishments in Chandigarh
Sports clubs established in 2012